Sampson Carter (born September 11, 1990) is an American professional basketball player who last played for the Leñadores de Durango of the Liga Nacional de Baloncesto Profesional (LNBP). He played college basketball for the University of Massachusetts Amherst.

High school career
Carter played high school basketball at Ridgeway High School in Memphis, Tennessee where he led the Roadrunners to their fourth state title with a 34–3 record, being named the MVP the Tennessee State Tournament and also, state MVP, player of the year, all district, and all state after averaging 17 points, seven rebounds and two blocks.

College career
In five years at Massachusetts, Carter averaged 7.1 points, 4.2 rebounds, 0.8 assists and 0.7 steals on 135 games (starting 88).

Professional career
After going undrafted in the 2014 NBA draft, Carter signed with BC Prievidza of the Slovakian league on August 16, 2014. However, he left the Slovak team before appearing in a game for them and signed with CAB Madeira from the Portuguese League on October 2. After a short three-game stint in Portugal ended in mid-November, he signed with Dominican outfit Cupes de Los Pepines in February 2015 and then with Club Virgilio Castillo the following month where he played out the 2014–15 campaign.

On October 6, 2015, Carter signed with the Memphis Grizzlies. However, he was waived on October 24 after appearing in six preseason games. On October 31, Carter was selected by the Canton Charge in the fifth round of the 2015 NBA Development League draft. However, he was waived by Canton on November 11. On March 7, 2016, Carter signed with Caballeros de Culiacán of the Mexican CIBACOPA. The next day, he made his debut for Culiacán in a 103–77 loss to the Frayles de Guasave, recording 28 points, four rebounds, four assists and one block in 28 minutes.

On August 2, 2018, Carter signed with the Island Storm of the National Basketball League of Canada (NBL Canada). In the 2018–19 season, Carter averaged 21.9 points, 7.7 rebounds, and 1.9 assists per game. He was named to the All-NBLC Second Team.

Personal life
Carter is the husband of Ashley Carter, the son of Alice Carter, and the brother of UMass Director of Player Personnel Shyrone Chatman. His other siblings include Natasha and Marcus Chatman. While at UMass, he majored in Communications.

References

External links

UMass bio
RealGM profile
USBasket profile
Sports-Reference profile

1990 births
Living people
American expatriate basketball people in Canada
American expatriate basketball people in the Dominican Republic
American expatriate basketball people in Mexico
American expatriate basketball people in the Philippines
American expatriate basketball people in Portugal
American men's basketball players
Basketball players from Baton Rouge, Louisiana
Caballeros de Culiacán players
CAB Madeira players
Forwards (basketball)
Hamilton Honey Badgers players
Island Storm players
Leñadores de Durango players
San Miguel Alab Pilipinas players
UMass Minutemen basketball players